Ivaylo Sashov Pargov (Bulgarian: Ивайло Сашов Паргов, born 21 August 1974) is a Bulgarian former footballer who played as a forward. He has been the manager of Marek Dupnitsa since September 2013.

Career
Pargov's first club was Marek Dupnitsa. In his career he also played in Minyor Pernik, Lokomotiv Sofia, Greek Anagennisi Giannitsa and Naftex Burgas. On 1 July 2008 Ivaylo Pargov signed a contract with Beroe Stara Zagora.

International career
Between 1994 and 1996 Pargov played in Bulgaria U21.

Personal
He is a son of Sasho Pargov.

References

External links
 Profile at sportal.bg

Bulgarian footballers
1974 births
Living people
People from Dupnitsa
Association football forwards
First Professional Football League (Bulgaria) players
Second Professional Football League (Bulgaria) players
PFC Marek Dupnitsa players
PFC Minyor Pernik players
FC Lokomotiv 1929 Sofia players
PFC Beroe Stara Zagora players
Bulgaria under-21 international footballers
Sportspeople from Kyustendil Province